A Public–private partnership unit (PPP unit) is an organisation responsible for promoting, facilitating and/or assessing Public-private partnerships (PPP, P3, 3P) in their territory. PPP units can be government agencies, or semi-independent organizations created with full or partial government support. Governments tend to create a PPP unit as a response to prior criticisms of the implementation of P3 projects in their country. In 2009, 50% of OECD countries had created a centralized PPP unit, and many more of these institutions exist in other countries.

Definition

There is no widely accepted definition of what a PPP unit is. The World Bank defines a PPP Unit as an organization that “promotes or improves PPPs. It may manage the number and quality of PPPs by trying to attract more PPPs or trying to ensure that the PPPs meet specific quality criteria such as affordability, value for money, and appropriate risk transfer.” Heather Whiteside describes them as "quasi-independent" institutions operating at "arm's length" from the government, and "created to promote, evaluate and develop P3 projects and policies."

Overview

Different governments have encountered different institutional challenges in the PPP procurement process which justified the creation of a PPP Unit. Hence, these centralized PPP units need to address these issues by shaping their functions to suit their government's needs. The function, location (within government), and jurisdiction (i.e., who controls it) of dedicated PPP units may differ among countries, but generally, they include:

Policy guidance and advice on the content of national legislation. The guidance also includes defining which sectors are eligible for PPPs, as well as which PPP methods and schemes can be carried out.
Approving or rejecting proposed PPP projects (e.g., playing a gatekeeper role at any stage of the process, such as the initial planning or final approval stage).
Providing technical support to government organizations at the project identification, evaluation, procurement, or contract-management phase.
Capacity building (e.g., training of public-sector officials that are involved in PPP programs or interested in the PPP process).
Promoting PPPs within the private sector (e.g., PPP market development).

The United Kingdom's PPP units, the Treasury Task Force on PPP (1997) and later Partnerships UK (1998) were staffed with people linked with the City of London, and accountancy and consultancy firms who had a vested interest in the success of the country's PPP policy: Private Finance Initiative. This helped the government override the public sector's opposition to expanding P3s. These institutions played a central role in establishing P3s as the "new normal" for public infrastructure procurements in the country. In contrast, the Infrastructure Investment Facilitation Center (1999) suffered from a lack of formal or informal power, and so was involved in less than half of the 3P projects developed in the country.

Effectiveness
A 2013 review of research into the value of centralized PPP units (and not looking at the value of PPPs in general or any other type of PPP arrangement, as it was aimed at providing evidence needed to decide whether or not to set up a centralized PPP unit) found:

No quantitative evidence: There is very little quantitative evidence of the value of centralized PPP coordination units vis-à-vis ministries or government agencies individually procuring PPP projects. Most of the studies conducted on PPP units focus on their role and carry out only brief descriptive analyses of their value.
Limited authority: The majority of the PPP units reviewed in the literature do not play a particularly important role in approving or rejecting PPP programs or projects. While their advice is used in the decision-making process by other government bodies, the majority do not actually have any executive power to make such decisions themselves. Hence, when they have more authority, their value is seen to be higher.
PPP units differ by country and sector: Government failures, in regards to PPP units, vary by government. The requirements for PPPs also vary by country and sector, as do the risks involved (financial, social, etc.) for the country government. Hence, PPP units need to be tailored to solve these failures and properly assess risks and need to be located in the correct government departments, where they can command the most power. PPP units can play a number of important roles in the PPP process, but not all such units will play the same role, as their functions have been tailored to the individual country's needs. In some cases, limits on their authority have curtailed their effectiveness.
Implicit value: The lack of rigorous evidence does not prove that PPP units are not an important contributor to the success of a country's PPP program. The literature review does show that while there is no quantitative data to this effect, there are widespread perceptions about the importance of a well-functioning PPP unit for the success of a country's PPP program.

The author of the 2013 review  found no literature that rigorously evaluates the usefulness of PPP units. The literature does show that PPP units should be individually tailored to different government functions, address different government failures, and be appropriately positioned to support the country's PPP program. Where these conditions seem to have been met, there is a consensus that PPP units have played a positive role in national PPP programs.

Criticism
Centralized PPP units have been criticized for structuring their project assessments with a bias in favor of PPPs over traditional procurement methods, especially if Promoting PPPs as part of their mandate. As P3 units are usually staffed with people linked with private financial, consultancy and accountancy firms who have a vested interest in the success of P3 policies, this creates an apparent conflict of interest.

Some PPP units have been criticized for paying their executive staff well above the public sector's standard pay rate, which was deemed necessary for enticing people with financial experience to work for them.

Some have questioned the usefulness of creating P3 units, as everything in their mandate could theoretically be accomplished by the government ministry responsible for public infrastructure.

List of PPP Units

Source: World Bank

See also
 Public-private partnerships by country
 Public-private partnerships in Canada
 Public-private partnerships in India
 Public-private partnerships in the United States
 Public–private partnership in transition economies
 Privatization

References

Public–private partnership
Government finances
Public economics
Government procurement
Public–private partnership units